The attack on Bari Alai (Battle of Nishagam) was a Taliban insurgent attack on the International Security Assistance Force (ISAF) Observation Post (OP) Bari Alai in the perimeter of Nishagam in Kunar Province, Afghanistan. The attack was successful in being the first time during the war in Afghanistan, the Taliban had completely overrun a coalition outpost. Survivors were few with the exception of 2 Latvian soldiers and a number of Afghan troops. The US detachment at the OP (3 in total) were all killed in action.

References

External links 
 DoD Identifies Army Casualties, Release No: 295-09. May 4, 2009
 DoD Announces Change in Status of Soldier, Release No: 299-09. May 5, 2009

War in Afghanistan (2001–2021)
Bari_Alai
Bari_Alai